Ehsan Khan is a Bangladeshi architect and activist.

Career
Khan completed his bachelor of architecture from Bangladesh University of Engineering and Technology. He designed the mausoleum of the founder of Bangladesh Sheikh Mujibur Rahman at Gopalgonj. He was nominated for an Aga Khan Award for Architecture in 2010 for designing the Nishorgo Oirabot Nature Interpretation Centre.

Notable works
 Nishorgo Oirabot Nature Interpretation Centre, Teknaf (2008)
 Mausoleum of Sheikh Mujibur Rahman

Awards
 Institute of Architects Bangladesh (IAB) Architect of the Year Award, for designing the mausoleum of Bangabandhu
 J.K. Cement Award for Architecture

References

Bangladeshi architects
Living people
Modernist architects
20th-century Bangladeshi architects
21st-century Bangladeshi architects
1960 births
Bangladesh University of Engineering and Technology alumni